Bruce William Graham, OBE (22 August 1919 – 18 February 1995) was an Australian politician. He was a member of the Liberal Party and served in the House of Representatives for over 20 years, representing the New South Wales seats of St George (1949–1954, 1955–1958) and North Sydney (1966–1980).

Early life
Graham was born in Sydney on 22 August 1919. He was educated at Sydney Grammar School before becoming an announcer on the ABC. He played rugby union with Eastern Suburbs RUFC, cricket for the Waverley Cricket Club, and was a member of the Tamarama Surf Life Saving Club.

Military service
Graham enlisted in the Royal Australian Air Force (RAAF) in March 1939. He spent time with No. 22 Squadron and No. 6 Squadron based out of RAAF Base Richmond. He joined the No. 2 Service Flying Training School at RAAF Base Forest Hill in August 1940. He was promoted flying officer three months later and then made flight lieutenant in January 1942. Graham was subsequently posted to No. 1 Air Observers School in Cootamundra, No. 33 Squadron in Townsville, and  No. 2 Air Ambulance Unit in Canberra.

In June 1942, Graham fractured his spine and both legs in an aircraft crash. He spent two years in hospital and underwent a number of operations, allowing him to return to active service. He was subsequently stationed at Parafield with No. 34 Squadron, at Uranquinty with No. 5 Service Flying Training School, at Bundaberg with No. 88 Operational Base Unit, and finally at RAAF headquarters in Sydney. He accumulated over 1,200 hours of flying time with the RAAF.

Graham's leg was amputated in May 1947, having deteriorated after initially successful surgeries. He received a medical discharge in September 1948, having attained the rank of squadron leader.

Politics
Graham was first elected to parliament at the 1949 federal election as the Liberal member for St George in the Australian House of Representatives. He held the seat until 1954, when he was defeated by former Labor minister Nelson Lemmon. Graham defeated Lemmon in 1955, but was defeated again in 1958, this time by Lionel Clay. He returned to politics in 1966 when he was elected to the seat of North Sydney, a position he held until his retirement in 1980. Graham died in 1995.

References

Liberal Party of Australia members of the Parliament of Australia
Members of the Australian House of Representatives for St George
Members of the Australian House of Representatives for North Sydney
Members of the Australian House of Representatives
Australian Officers of the Order of the British Empire
1919 births
1995 deaths
20th-century Australian politicians
Royal Australian Air Force officers
Royal Australian Air Force personnel of World War II
Australian amputees
People educated at Sydney Grammar School